Platysmacheilus zhenjiangensis is a species of cyprinid endemic to China.

References

Platysmacheilus
Fish described in 2005